Charaxes x fuscus is a naturally occurring hybrid between two sympatric species of butterfly in the family Nymphalidae. It was found in the Central African Republic. The habitat consists of lowland evergreen forests.

Described from a single male collected from Bangui by Plantrou, it is now proven to be the only known example of a naturally occurring hybrid (Charaxes numenes x probably Charaxes cynthia)

Taxonomy
Charaxes tiridates group.

The supposed clade members are:
Charaxes tiridates
Charaxes numenes similar to next
Charaxes bipunctatus similar to last
Charaxes violetta
Charaxes fuscus
Charaxes mixtus
Charaxes bubastis
Charaxes albimaculatus
Charaxes barnsi
Charaxes bohemani
Charaxes schoutedeni
Charaxes monteiri
Charaxes smaragdalis
Charaxes xiphares
Charaxes cithaeron
Charaxes nandina
Charaxes imperialis
Charaxes ameliae
Charaxes pythodoris
? Charaxes overlaeti
For a full list see Eric Vingerhoedt, 2013.

References

Victor Gurney Logan Van Someren, 1972 Revisional notes on African Charaxes (Lepidoptera: Nymphalidae). Part VIII. Bulletin of the British Museum (Natural History) (Entomology)215-264.

External links
Charaxes fuscus images at Consortium for the Barcode of Life

Butterflies described in 1967
fuscus
Endemic fauna of the Central African Republic
Butterflies of Africa